Michael Grady (born 6 February 1946) is an English character actor. He is probably best known for his comedy roles in films and TV, particularly as Ken Mills in Citizen Smith (1977—1980) and Barry Wilkinson in Last of the Summer Wine (1986–2010).

Career 
After a classical training at the Bristol Old Vic Theatre School, his career has spanned more than 40 years, and includes theatre roles at the Royal Shakespeare Company and London's Royal National Theatre, as well the West End, the Royal Court, the Bush, and the Soho Poly, plus many tours and pantomimes around the country.

His television roles have included Minder as Kev in the Series 1 episode, The Bengal Tiger, Steve Bracket in Rooms, Citizen Smith (series regular, Ken Mills), Look and Read, Dr Ballantyne, Sweet Sixteen, 161 episodes of Last of the Summer Wine playing Barry Wilkinson, husband of Glenda, Colin's Sandwich, Up the Garden Path and Not with a Bang. His film credits include Carry On Loving (1970), Up the Front (1972), Symptoms (1974), The Return of the Pink Panther (1975) opposite Peter Sellers, I'm Not Feeling Myself Tonight (1976), Britannia Hospital (1982), Bert Rigby, You're a Fool (1989) and Sherlock Holmes: A Game of Shadows (2011).
  He was also in the Wycliffe episode Slave of Duty. He also has starred in adverts including a Pepsi advert from 1976. 

A regular performer on radio, Grady played Rob Pengelly in Waggoner's Walk, a BBC Radio 2 soap opera. He has been involved in award-winning productions such as Christianity at Glacier for BBC Radio 3 and comedies Up the Garden Path, Dial M For Pizza and Giles Wemmbley-Hogg Goes Off.

He continues work in the theatre and on television. In March 2023, Grady portrayed Clyde Taylor in an episode of the BBC soap opera Doctors.

Filmography

Film

Television

References

External links 

1946 births
Male actors from Gloucestershire
Alumni of Bristol Old Vic Theatre School
English male film actors
English male stage actors
English male television actors
Living people
People from Cheltenham
British male comedy actors